Twice-Told Tales is a 1963 American horror anthology film directed by Sidney Salkow and starring Vincent Price. It consists of three segments, all loosely adapted by producer/screenwriter Robert E. Kent from works by Nathaniel Hawthorne.

Plot
Each of the three sequences is introduced by Vincent Price (in a voice-over). Price also stars in all three narratives.

"Dr. Heidegger's Experiment"
Two elderly friends, Carl Heidegger (Sebastian Cabot) and Alex (Price), meet to celebrate Heidegger's 79th birthday. They discover that Heidegger's fiancée from 38 years before, Sylvia (Mari Blanchard), is perfectly preserved in her coffin. Heidegger believes that the water dripping into the coffin has the power to preserve. He tries it on a withered rose and it comes back into full bloom.

Carl and Alex drink it and become young again. Carl injects the liquid into Sylvia and she comes back to life.  Sylvia reveals that she and Alex were secretly lovers. Carl attacks Alex, but Alex kills him in the struggle. The effects of the water wear off. Sylvia is reduced to a desiccated skeleton, Carl's body returns to its original age. Alex returns to the crypt to find more of the water, but it no longer flows.

"Rappaccini's Daughter"
In Padua, Giacomo Rappaccini (Price) keeps his daughter Beatrice (Joyce Taylor) in a garden. A university student next door, Giovanni (Brett Halsey), sees her and falls in love. One of Giovanni's professors says that he used to teach with Rappaccini.  Many years ago, Rappaccini abruptly quit academia and became a recluse after his wife ran away with a lover. Rappaccini has treated Beatrice with an exotic plant extract that makes her touch deadly; he does this to keep her safe from unwanted suitors, but it makes her a prisoner in her own home.

When Rappaccini sees the attraction between Giovanni and Beatrice, he surreptitiously treats Giovanni with the extract so they can be together. Giovanni is aghast, and obtains an experimental antidote from his professor. He consumes the antidote in front of Beatrice, but it kills him. Beatrice drinks it also, killing herself. Rappaccini grabs the exotic plant with both hands and its touch kills him.

"The House of the Seven Gables"
Gerald Pyncheon (Price) returns to his family house after an absence of 17 years, bringing with him his wife Alice (Beverly Garland). His sister Hannah (Jacqueline deWit), who had been living in the house, tells Alice about the curse put upon Pyncheon men by Mathew Maulle, who used to own the house but lost it in a shady deal to the Pyncheon family. Jonathan Maulle (Richard Denning), a descendant of Mathew, arrives, but he refuses Gerald's offer to give him the house in exchange for the location of a vault where valuable property deeds are stored. Alice becomes haunted by the curse on the house, which eventually leads her to the cellar.

Gerald finds her there and, lifting up the basement grave of Mathew Maulle, discovers the map to the vault. He kills Hannah to keep her share of the inheritance. Gerald traps Alice in the grave, then goes to the study to find the vault. He opens it, and a skeletal hand inside the vault kills him. Jonathan arrives and takes Alice out of the house, just as it shakes and collapses into rubble.

Cast
Vincent Price as  Alex Medbourne / Giacomo Rappaccini / Gerald Pyncheon 
Sebastian Cabot as  Dr. Carl Heidegger 
Brett Halsey as Giovanni Guasconti 
Beverly Garland as  Alice Pyncheon 
Richard Denning as Jonathan Maulle 
Mari Blanchard as Sylvia Ward 
Abraham Sofaer as  Prof. Pietro Baglioni 
Jacqueline deWit as  Hannah Pyncheon, Gerald's Sister 
Joyce Taylor as Beatrice Rappaccini 
Edith Evanson as  Lisabetta, the landlady 
Floyd Simmons as  Ghost of Mathew Maulle 
Gene Roth as  Cabman

Production background
The film is an 'omnibus'-style film based on two of Nathaniel Hawthorne's stories, "Dr. Heidegger's Experiment" (1837) and "Rappaccini's Daughter" (1844), and on the novel The House of the Seven Gables (1851), which had previously been adapted in 1940 also starring Price.  Only "Dr. Heidegger's Experiment" was actually published in Hawthorne's Twice-Told Tales, which supplied the film's title. Similar to Tales of Terror (1962), Price appeared in all three segments.

Production
Filming started on Halloween 1962.

See also
 List of American films of 1963

References

External links

 
 

1963 films
1963 horror films
1960s English-language films
1960s fantasy films
American horror anthology films
American science fiction horror films
American supernatural horror films
Films based on American novels
Films based on multiple works
Films based on short fiction
Films based on works by Nathaniel Hawthorne
Films directed by Sidney Salkow
Films produced by Edward Small
Films scored by Richard LaSalle
United Artists films
1960s American films